New Columbus is a borough in Luzerne County, Pennsylvania, United States. The population was 219 at the 2020 census.

History
New Columbus was first settled in 1819. It was later incorporated as a borough in 1859. The community has not changed much since its founding; farming is still a major way of life for most of the borough.

Geography
New Columbus is located at  (41.1734, -76.2935).

It is a small farming town located in western Luzerne County (just south of Ricketts Glen State Park). There are small clusters of houses scattered throughout the borough; most of the community consists of farmland. Downtown New Columbus, which consists of a few homes and businesses, is located at the intersection of Old Tioga Turnpike and Academy Street.

Demographics

As of the census of 2000, there were 215 people, 86 households, and 63 families residing in the borough. The population density was 68.1 people per square mile (26.3/km2). There were 96 housing units at an average density of 30.4 per square mile (11.7/km2).

The racial makeup of the borough was 100.00% white. Hispanic or Latino of any race were 1.40% of the population.

There were 86 households, out of which 31.4% had children under the age of 18 living with them, 60.5% were married couples living together, 9.3% had a female householder with no husband present, and 25.6% were non-families. 22.1% of all households were made up of individuals, and 11.6% had someone living alone who was 65 years of age or older. The average household size was 2.50 and the average family size was 2.94.

In the borough the population was spread out, with 25.1% under the age of 18, 5.1% from 18 to 24, 31.2% from 25 to 44, 18.6% from 45 to 64, and 20.0% who were 65 years of age or older. The median age was 36 years. For every 100 females there were 87.0 males. For every 100 females age 18 and over, there were 96.3 males.

The median income for a household in the borough was $38,594, and the median income for a family was $39,844. Males had a median income of $31,250 versus $21,071 for females. The per capita income for the borough was $15,981. None of the families and 2.7% of the population were living below the poverty line, including no under eighteens and 8.7% of those over 64.

The population of New Columbus was 222 as of 2017.

References

External links

Populated places established in 1819
Boroughs in Luzerne County, Pennsylvania
1859 establishments in Pennsylvania